Glucosidase 2 subunit beta is an enzyme that in humans is encoded by the PRKCSH gene.

This gene encodes the beta-subunit of glucosidase II, an N-linked glycan-processing enzyme in the endoplasmic reticulum (ER). This protein is an acidic phospho-protein known to be a substrate for protein kinase C. Mutations in this gene have been associated with the autosomal dominant polycystic liver disease (PCLD). Alternatively spliced transcript variants encoding distinct isoforms have been observed.

References

Further reading

EF-hand-containing proteins